Muhammad Abdul Latif Biswas (born 11 January 1953) is a Bangladeshi politician, diplomat, and freedom fighter. He is currently serving as District Council Administrator of Sirajganj District as of September 2022.

Early life and education 
Biswas was born in Meghulla village, Belkuchi Upazila, Sirajganj District in erstwhile Pakistan). He passed the matriculation exam from Belkuchi Pilot High School. and intermediate examination in 1986 from Belkuchi Degree College.

Career 
Biswas became a Bangladesh Member of Parliament for constituency Sirajganj-5 in 1996 when the Bangladesh Awami League headed Bangladesh's coalition government. He lost his position before being reelected in 2009. He was the minister of Fisheries and Livestock until January 2014. On September 10, 2022 he selected as chairman of Sirajganj district councils for second consecutive terms.

References 

1953 births
Living people
People from Sirajganj District
Fisheries and Livestock ministers of Bangladesh
9th Jatiya Sangsad members
7th Jatiya Sangsad members